This is a list of the reptiles of Canada. Most species are confined to the southernmost parts of the country. All Canadian reptiles are composed of squamates and testudines.

Conservation status - IUCN Red List of Threatened Species:
 - Extinct,  - Extinct in the wild
 - Critically endangered,  - Endangered,  - Vulnerable
 - Near threatened,  - Least concern
 - Data deficient,  - Not evaluated
(v. 2013.2, the data is current as of 5 March 2014)

Order Squamata 

Of the order Squamata, lizards and snakes are represented. There are no known amphisbaenids native to Canada.

Snakes (suborder Serpentes) 
Snakes are the best-represented group of reptiles in Canada, with 35 varieties in three families. They can be found in all provinces and territories except Yukon, Nunavut, and Newfoundland and Labrador.
Charina bottae (rubber boa)  – southern British Columbia, but not Vancouver Island
Coluber constrictor foxii (blue racer)  – Pelee Island in Ontario
Coluber constrictor flaviventris (eastern yellow-bellied racer)  – southern Saskatchewan
Coluber constrictor mormon (western yellow-bellied racer)  – south-central British Columbia
Contia tenuis (common sharp-tailed snake)  – southern Vancouver Island in British Columbia
Crotalus horridus (timber rattlesnake)  – once present in southern Ontario and southern Quebec; extirpated
Crotalus oreganus oreganus (northern Pacific rattlesnake)  – south-central British Columbia
Crotalus viridis viridis (prairie rattlesnake)  – southern Alberta, southwestern Saskatchewan
Diadophis punctatus edwardsii (northern ring-necked snake)  – southeastern Ontario, southern Quebec, most of New Brunswick, and Nova Scotia
Hypsiglena torquata (desert night snake)  – extreme south-central British Columbia
Heterodon nasicus nasicus (western hog-nosed snake)  – southeastern Alberta southern Saskatchewan and southwestern Manitoba
Heterodon platirhinos (eastern hog-nosed snake)  – southwestern Ontario
Lampropeltis triangulum (eastern milk snake) – southern Ontario southern Quebec
Nerodia sipedon insularum (Lake Erie watersnake)  – islands in western Lake Erie
Nerodia sipedon sipedon (northern watersnake)  – southern and central Ontario, southern Quebec
Opheodrys vernalis (smooth green snake)  – southeast Saskatchewan, southern Manitoba, central and southern Ontario, southern Quebec, most of New Brunswick, Nova Scotia, and Prince Edward Island
Pantherophis gloydi (eastern foxsnake)  – southwestern Ontario
Pantherophis obsoleta obsoleta (black ratsnake)  – southern Ontario
Pantherophis spiloides (grey ratsnake) – southeastern Ontario
Pituophis catenifer deserticola (Great Basin gophersnake)  – south-central British Columbia
Pituophis catenifer sayi (bullsnake)  – southern Alberta and southern Saskatchewan
Regina septemvittata (queen snake)  – southwestern Ontario
Sistrurus catenatus (eastern massasauga)  – Bruce Peninsula and some parts of southwestern Ontario
Storeria dekayi (Dekay's brownsnake)  – southern Ontario, southern Quebec
Storeria occipitomaculata occipitomaculata (northern red-bellied snake)  - southeastern Saskatchewan, southern Manitoba, southwestern and southeastern Ontario, southern Quebec, most of New Brunswick, Nova Scotia, and Prince Edward Island
Thamnophis butleri (Butler's gartersnake)  – southwestern Ontario
Thamnophis elegans vagrans (wandering gartersnake)  – most of British Columbia, most of Alberta, southwestern Saskatchewan, and possibly the Liard River Valley in southwestern Northwest Territories
Thamnophis ordinoides (northwestern gartersnake)  – southwestern British Columbia, including Vancouver Island
Thamnophis radix haydeni (plains gartersnake)  – eastern Alberta, southern Saskatchewan and southwestern Manitoba
Thamnophis sauritus septentrionalis (northern ribbonsnake)  – southern Ontario and southwestern Nova Scotia
Thamnophis sirtalis fitchi (valley garter snake)  – central mainland British Columbia almost up to the Yukon border, and northern Vancouver Island
Thamnophis sirtalis pallidulus (Maritime garter snake)  – southern half of Quebec, most of New Brunswick, Nova Scotia, and Prince Edward Island
Thamnophis sirtalis parietalis (red-sided gartersnake)  – eastern plains of British Columbia, most of Alberta, extreme southern Northwest Territories around the Fort Smith region, most of Saskatchewan, southern half of Manitoba, and northwestern Ontario
Thamnophis sirtalis pickeringi (Puget Sound gartersnake)  – southwest corner of British Columbia, including southern Vancouver Island
Thamnophis sirtalis sirtalis (eastern gartersnake)  – most of Ontario and Quebec, and the southeast corner of Manitoba

Lizards (suborder Lacertilia) 
Lizard diversity is low in Canada, with six native species and one introduced species:
Elgaria coerulea principis (northwestern alligator lizard)  – southern British Columbia, including most of Vancouver Island
Plestiodon skiltonianus (western skink)  - southern interior of British Columbia
Plestiodon fasciatus (five-lined skink)  – southern Ontario
Plestiodon septentrionalis septentrionalis (northern prairie skink)  – southwestern Manitoba
Phrynosoma douglasii (pygmy horned lizard)  – extreme south-central British Columbia
Phrynosoma hernandesi (short-horned lizard)  – extreme southeastern Alberta and southern Saskatchewan
Podarcis muralis (common wall lizard) - introduced - southeastern Vancouver Island, Denman Island, single records in Vancouver, Summerland and Osoyoos but no populations on BC mainland.

Order Testudines 
Of the order Testudines, pond turtles are common in all of Canada's provinces, with the exception of Newfoundland and Labrador, which has sea turtles off its shores as does British Columbia.

Land and pond turtles
Actinemys marmorata (Pacific pond turtle)  extirpated
Apalone spinifera (spiny softshell turtle) 
Chelydra serpentina (common snapping turtle) 
Chrysemys picta (painted turtle) 
Clemmys guttata (spotted turtle) 

Emydoidea blandingii (Blanding's turtle) 
Glyptemys insculpta (wood turtle) 
Graptemys geographica (northern map turtle) 
Sternotherus odoratus (stinkpot turtle) 
Terrapene carolina (eastern box turtle)  extirpated

Sea turtles
Caretta caretta (loggerhead sea turtle) 
Chelonia mydas (green sea turtle) 
Dermochelys coriacea (leatherback sea turtle) 
Lepidochelys kempii (Kemp's ridley sea turtle) 
Lepidochelys olivacea (olive ridley sea turtle)

See also

Lists of reptiles by region

References

Further reading

External links
 JCVI Reptiles Database: Canada
IUCN Red List of Threatened Species

Canada
 
Reptiles
Canada